Line 3 of the Athens Metro runs from  to , via Syntagma, although most of the trains reverse at . The section from Dimotiko Theatro to the tunnel portal east of Doukissis Plakentias is underground, and the section from Doukissis Plakentias to Airport is shared with Athens Suburban Railway trains, implementing a form of the Karlsruhe model.

In 2012, construction works commenced for the latest underground extension of Line 3 to  via  which was completed on 10 October 2022.

Rolling Stock 

Dual voltage ROTEM-supplied stock with greater luggage space is used for services to Athens International Airport.  Line 3 rail vehicles utilize 750 V DC third rail current collection between Nikaia and Doukissis Plakentias, changing to 25 kV AC overhead catenary while operating on the Athens Suburban Railway for access to/from the airport.

Extension to Piraeus 

The extension to Nikaia in 2020 brought the Korydallos and Nikaia municipalities into the network's catchment area, serve approximately 132,000 passengers on a daily basis and upon completion in 2022,  connects to the port of Piraeus, the largest passenger port of Europe  with the Athens International Airport in just 1 hour.
The completion dates of the final three stations are as follows:
 Maniatika (10 October 2022)
 Piraeus (10 October 2022)
 Dimotiko Theatro ("Municipal Theatre", 10 October 2022)

Notes
 The original plans included one more station after Dimotiko Theatro, named Evaggelistria. Attiko Metro cancelled plans for the station on 10 November 2008, due to local objections.
 There were plans to build a station between Korydallos and Nikaia named Perivolaki.

2018 timetable controversy 
On 1 November 2018, STASY introduced a new timetable that scrapped direct metro services to the airport from the city center, due to the lack of spare parts for the fleet. Reception towards the timetable changes was overwhelmingly negative: the negative reception included a complaint by the Minister for Transport, Thanos Vourdas, claiming that STASY required ministerial approval to scrap the airport trains. On 9 November 2018, STASY decided to reinstate the original service pattern, from 10 November 2018.

Stations 

The spelling of the station names on this table, in English and Greek, are according to the signage.

Notes

References

External links 
Athens Metro official website

Athens Metro lines
Railway lines opened in 2000
2000 establishments in Greece